Michelle Leonardo (born June 28, 1991) is an American dancer and model and beauty pageant contestant who won the Miss New Jersey Teen USA pageant in 2008 and the Miss New Jersey USA pageant in 2012. She placed in the Top 10 at Miss USA 2012. She won Miss Teen United States-World 2009 and placed 3rd runner up at Miss Teen World 2009.

Leonardo is currently a Digital Investment Supervisor at Horizon Media and is dancing for the New York Knicks. In 2015, Leonardo was a dancer for the Boston Celtics. She appeared on Guiding Light and in print ads for corporations such as Polaroid, Million Dollar Baby Swimsuits and Sesame Street Kids. She has been in three Seventeen Magazine Fashion shows including one for Fall New York Fashion Week. She was an on-air reporter for the Boston-based show Style It Up.

Michelle Leonardo was born to Anthony and Laura Leonardo in Montclair, New Jersey and raised in Tinton Falls. She has one younger sister, Lainie. Leonardo attended Red Bank Catholic High School in Red Bank, New Jersey. She graduated from Suffolk University in Boston, Massachusetts, where she obtained her Bachelor of Science in broadcast journalism.

References 

1991 births
Living people
American beauty pageant winners
American cheerleaders
American female dancers
American dancers
Beauty pageant contestants from New Jersey
2008 beauty pageant contestants
21st-century Miss Teen USA delegates
Miss USA 2012 delegates
National Basketball Association cheerleaders
People from Tinton Falls, New Jersey
Red Bank Catholic High School alumni
Suffolk University alumni
Dancers from New Jersey